KKDY (102.5 FM, "Hot Country 102.5") is a radio station licensed in West Plains, Missouri.  The station is owned by Central Ozark Radio Network, Inc. It airs a country music format. KKDY's signal can be heard from Seymour, Missouri to Doniphan, Missouri.

History
KKDY signed on the air at 102.3 FM on March 31, 1984, running a Top 40/CHR format for the station's first ten years in operation serving Southern Missouri and Northern Arkansas. The station's frequency moved to 102.5 FM in December 1989, retaining its CHR format. The station continued to run Top 40 until 1994 when the station dropped CHR for its current country format.

References

External links 
KKDY official website
Ozark Radio Network

KDY
Country radio stations in the United States
Howell County, Missouri